XHHQ-FM is a radio station on 97.1 FM in Hermosillo, Sonora. The station is owned by Corporativo Radiofonico del Noroeste and carries a grupera format known as La Número Uno.

History
XEHQ-AM 590 received its concession on July 29, 1942, owned by Radio Hermosillo, S. de R.L. In the 2000s, XEHQ moved to 920 kHz (switching frequencies with XEBH) and was sold to Capital Media. The station migrated to FM in 2011.

In December 2017, operation of the station passed from Corporativo Radiofónico del Noroeste to Grupo Larsa Comunicaciones, bringing its Hermosillo station count to four. The relationship between the two ended by August, when Larsa flipped competing station XHVSS-FM to grupera as "La Más Chingona".

On August 22, 2018, the IFT approved the transfer of the station's concession from Capital Media to Corporativo Radiofónico del Noroeste de México, S.A. de C.V.

References

Radio stations in Sonora
Radio stations established in 1942
1942 establishments in Mexico